Timothy J. Dunne is a British scholar of international relations, currently serving as Provost and Senior Vice-President at the University of Surrey. He is also an Emeritus Professor at the University of Queensland, where he was previously Deputy Provost and Dean of Humanities and Social Sciences.

Dunne completed his undergraduate degree at the University of East Anglia in 1989, and received his MPhil and DPhil in International Relations from St Antony's College, Oxford. Before his move to the University of Queensland, he was Professor of International Relations at the University of Exeter where he served as Dean of the College of Social Sciences. 

As a theorist, Dunne has written on many paradigms, but his primary theoretical interest is in the English school. He has served as an associate editor for several journals, including the Review of International Studies (1998-2002), the International Journal of Human Rights (2000-2004), and was an editor of the European Journal of International Relations. (2009-2013)

His theoretical research interests connect to an applied agenda. He has published widely on human rights, on foreign policy (with particular reference to the United Kingdom), on the changing dynamics of world order after 9/11, and on global responsibility for the protection of human rights. He writes for UK and international media, including The Guardian.

Selected publications

Books
Tim Dunne, Milja Kurki, Steve Smith eds., International Relations Theories: Discipline and Diversity (Oxford: OUP, 2nd edition, 2010).
Tim Dunne, Steve Smith, Amelia Hadfield eds., Foreign Policy: Theories, Actors, Cases (Oxford: OUP, 2008).
Tim Dunne and Ken Booth eds., Worlds in Collision:  Terror and the Future of Global Order (London Palgrave-Macmillan, 2002).
Tim Dunne and Nicholas J. Wheeler eds., Human Rights in Global Politics  (Cambridge: Cambridge University Press, 1999).
Tim Dunne, Inventing International Society: A History of the English School (London: Macmillan, St Antony's Series, 1998).
Tim Dunne, Michael Cox, Ken Booth eds., The Eighty Years’ Crisis: International Politics, 1919-1999.

Significant articles

References

Year of birth missing (living people)
Living people
Alumni of the University of East Anglia
Alumni of St Antony's College, Oxford
Academics of the University of Exeter
International relations scholars